Namati is a village in Nalbari district, Assam, India. As per the 2011 Census of India, Namati village has a total population of 3,807 people including 1,943 males and 1,864 females.

References 

Villages in Nalbari district